Alba Adèle August (born 1993) is a Danish-born Swedish actress and singer.

Early life
She is the daughter of Danish director Bille August and Swedish actress and director Pernilla August, who divorced in 1997. Her older sister Asta Ostergren is also an actress. On her father's side, she has two older half-brothers named Adam August and Anders August who are both screenwriters.

Career
August started as a child actor and debuted in a minor role in her father's film A Song for Martin (2001). In 2017, August was cast in the Danish language Netflix series The Rain. She also received positive reviews for her role in Becoming Astrid.

She graduated from the National School of Performing Arts in Copenhagen in 2018.

On 30 July 2020, August released her single "We're Not Gonna Make It". It was featured in the soundtrack of Netflix series The Rain.

On 12 November 2021, August released her debut album I Still Hide, which entered the top 10 on Apple Music's Swedish album chart.

Personal life 
She speaks Swedish and Danish on a native-speaker level. She also speaks English.

Filmography

Film

Television

Discography

Albums

Extended plays

Singles

Other charted songs

References

External links

1993 births
Living people
Actresses from Copenhagen
Danish film actresses
Danish television actresses
English-language singers from Sweden
Swedish child actresses
Swedish film actresses
Swedish television actresses
21st-century Danish actresses
21st-century Swedish actresses